David A. Rausch (1947-2023) is an author and former Professor of History at Ashland University in Ohio.

Education and Career 
Dr. Rausch received his M.A. in History from Youngstown State University in 1973 with a thesis "The Historical Jesus: A Current Perspective," and his Ph.D. in History from Kent State University in 1978 with a thesis "Proto-Fundamentalism's Attitudes toward Zionism, 1878–1918."

He spent most of his academic career as a Professor at Ashland University in Ohio—first as Professor of Church History and Judaic Studies at Ashland Theological Seminary (a seminary associated with The Brethren Church and graduate school within Ashland University) from 1980-1990, then as Professor of History at Ashland University from 1990 to 2005. He served as Chair of the History and Political Science Department at Ashland University.

Rausch has written hundreds of articles and at least thirty-nine books.

Books
Among the most widely held books by Rausch are the following
Zionism within Early American Fundamentalism, 1878–1918: A Convergence of Two Traditions (Lewiston, New York: Edwin Mellen Press, 1979)
Messianic Judaism: Its History, Theology, and Polity (Lewiston, New York: Edwin Mellen Press, 1982)
Arno C. Gaebelein, 1861–1945: Irenic Fundamentalist and Scholar; including conversations with Dr. Frank E. Gaebelein (Lewiston, New York: Edwin Mellen Press, 1983)
(editor) Louis Meyer's Eminent Hebrew Christians of the Nineteenth Century: Brief Biographical Sketches (1983)
A Legacy of Hatred: Why Christians must not Forget the Holocaust (Baker, 1984)
Protestantism: Its Modern Meaning (Fortress Press, 1987)
Building Bridges: Understanding Jews and Judaism (1988)
World Religions: Our Quest for Meaning (Trinity Press International, 1989)
The Middle East Maze: Israel and her Neighbors (Moody, 1991)
Communities in Conflict: Evangelicals and Jews (Trinity Press International, 1991)
Fundamentalist-Evangelicals and Anti-Semitism (Trinity Press International, 1992)
Native American Voices (Baker Books, 1994)
A Historical, Philosophical, and Pragmatic Approach to Penology (Lewiston, New York: Edwin Mellen Press, 1995)
Friends, Colleagues, and Neighbors: Jewish Contributions to American History (Baker, 1996)

References

American non-fiction writers
American male journalists
Ashland University faculty
Year of birth missing
Place of birth missing
Possibly living people